Petrčane  is a dalmatian village located some 12 kilometres north of the town of Zadar, Croatia.

Petrčane, historically sometimes referred to as Petrčani, is a 900-year old village with a population of 601 as of 2011. It has a bay surrounded by two peninsulas – Punta Radman and Punta Skala. 
Today tourism is the main source of income for the local population who rent apartments, rooms and villas.
The historical towns Nin and Zadar are a located to the north and south of the village. It was first mentioned in 1070 and had been traditionally an agricultural and fishing settlement. Its inhabitants speak a distinct Croatian dialect.

References

External links

Petrčane, Zadar Tourist Board https://zadar.travel/explore/petrcane/

Populated places in Zadar County